Robert Pitt (1680 – 21 May 1727) was a British politician who sat in the House of Commons from 1705 to 1727. He was the father and grandfather of two prime ministers, William Pitt the elder and William Pitt the younger.

Early life
Pitt was the eldest son of Governor Thomas 'Diamond' Pitt, a businessman who had made a fortune while in India. Governor Pitt built the family's wealth on his acquisition of the Pitt Diamond which he then sold on for a large profit. The diamond was brought into Britain in the heel of Robert Pitt's boot. In 1704, Pitt married Harriet Villiers, the daughter of Edward Villiers-FitzGerald and the Irish heiress Katherine FitzGerald.

Political career
In 1705 Pitt was returned as Member of Parliament for Old Sarum, a pocket borough controlled by his family. He retained the seat at the 1708 general election, but in 1710 was not put forward by his father and was returned instead on his own account as MP for Salisbury. He came third in the poll at Salisbury at the 1713 general election but his father then put him up at Old Sarun again where he was returned. At the 1715 general election Pitt stood for Parliament at Old Sarum and Salisbury but was only returned for Old Sarum. At the 1722 general election he stood at Old Sarum and Okehampton, and chose to take the seat at Okehampton, where he remained until his death. Unlike the rest of his family, who were Whigs, Robert Pitt became a Tory possibly partly in resistance to his domineering Whig father.

Death and family

Pitt inherited the family estate of Boconnoc following his father's death in 1726. However, he died the next year. He left two sons and five daughters. His elder son Thomas Pitt was also an MP who sat for Okehampton and the Pitt estate passed entirely to him. His second son was William Pitt the Elder, a British statesmen who led the country three times in 1756–57, 1757–1762 and 1766–1768. His daughter Harriott married William Corbet. His grandson William Pitt the Younger became Prime Minister in 1783. Pitt was also brother-in-law to General James Stanhope, through his sister Lucy Pitt.

References

Bibliography
 Black, Jeremy. Pitt the Elder. Cambridge University Press, 1992.
 Brown, Peter Douglas. William Pitt, Earl of Chatham: The Great Commoner. Allen & Unwin, 1978.

1680 births
1727 deaths
British MPs 1707–1708
British MPs 1708–1710
British MPs 1710–1713
British MPs 1722–1727
Members of the Parliament of Great Britain for English constituencies
English MPs 1705–1707
British MPs 1713–1715
British MPs 1715–1722
Robert
Parents of prime ministers of the United Kingdom
Members of the Parliament of Great Britain for Okehampton